Enrica Maria Modugno (born 5 August 1958 in Rome) is an Italian actress. She is most noted for her roles in Brothers Taviani's "Kaos" (1984), The Mass Is Ended (La messa è finita), for which she received a Ciak d'oro nomination for Best Actress in 1986, and the Canadian film La Sarrasine, for which she received a Genie Award nomination for Best Actress at the 13th Genie Awards in 1992.

Her other film roles have included The Night of the Shooting Stars (1982), Kaos (1984), The Moro Affair (1986), The Story of Boys & Girls (1989) and ''La scuola (1995).

References

External links

1958 births
20th-century Italian actresses
21st-century Italian actresses
Italian film actresses
Italian television actresses
Actresses from Rome
Living people